The 1949–50 Romanian Hockey League season was the 20th season of the Romanian Hockey League. Four teams participated in the league, and RATA Targu Mures won the championship.

Regular season

External links
hochei.net

Romania
Romanian Hockey League seasons
1949–50 in Romanian ice hockey